The siege of Kuju (Korean: 귀주성전투) which occurred in 1231 was a decisive Goryeo victory against the Mongol Empire. After the Mongol army crossed the Yalu river, it quickly captured almost all of Goryeo's border defenses. The Mongol army, however, ran into stiff resistance both at Anju and the city of Kuju (modern-day Kusong), commanded by General Park Seo.

To take Kuju, Saritai used a full array of siege weapons to bring down the city's defenses. Lines of catapults launched both boulders and molten metals at the city's walls. The Mongols deployed special assault teams who manned siege towers and scaling ladders. Other tactics used were pushing flaming carts against the city's wooden gates and tunneling under the walls. The most grisly weapon used during the siege were fire-bombs which contained boiled down, liquefied human fat.

According to an old Mongol general who, toward the end of the siege said:

"...I have never seen [a city] undergo an attack like this which did not, in the end, submit."

Despite the fact the Goryeo army was heavily outnumbered and after over thirty days of brutal siege warfare, Goryeo soldiers still refused to surrender and with mounting Mongol casualties, the Mongol army could not take the city and had to withdraw.

See also
Mongol invasions of Korea
History of Korea
Battle of Guju

References

Goryeo
Kuju
Kusong
1231 in the Mongol Empire
Kuju
Kuju